is a Japanese voice actor from Kōchi Prefecture, who is currently affiliated with Arts Vision. He is best known for his roles in Chiisai Kojin Microman (as Gunbody) and The Legend of Zelda: Twilight Princess (as Ganondorf).

Filmography

Television animation
Argento Soma (xxxx) (Yōin Kyōiku)
Chiisai Kojin Microman (xxxx) (Gunbody)
Jungle King Tar-chan (xxxx) (Hunter)
 Makai Senki Disgaea (xxxx) (Vulcanus)
Scrapped Princess (xxxx) (Roy)
SD Gundam Sangokuden Brave Battle Warriors (xxxx) (Ryuuhyou Gundam)
Shōnen Ashipe (xxxx) (Mao's Papa)
Witch Hunter Robin (2002) (Ikeuchi)

OVA
Konpeki no Kantai (xxxx) (Shōri Nihonyanagi)
Legend of the Galactic Heroes (xxxx) (Disshu/Ottotēru)

Web animation
Bakumatsu Kikansetsu Irohanihoheto (xxxx) (Peddler)

Tokusatsu
Gosei Sentai Dairanger (1993) (Narration)
Gekisou Sentai Carranger (1996) (Zoku Green (ep. 25))
Denji Sentai Megaranger (1997) (Dokuga Nejire (ep. 16))
Seijuu Sentai Gingaman (1998) (Kemuemon (ep. 15))
Hyakujuu Sentai Gaoranger (2001) (Magic Flute Org (ep. 36))
Ninpuu Sentai Hurricanger (2002) (Karaku Warror Furaimaru, Narration)
Bakuryuu Sentai Abaranger (2003) (Tsuribakatsuoribu (ep. 26))
Samurai Sentai Shinkenger (2009) (Secret Analysis Case Inromaru Voice (ep. 24 - 49) Narration)
Kaizoku Sentai Gokaiger (2011) (Furaimaru (eps. 25 - 50))
Ninpuu Sentai Hurricanger 10 Years After (2013) (Zeroth Lance Bat Ze Runba, Narration)

Video games
Disgaea: Hour of Darkness (Vulcanus)
Flash Hiders (xxxx) (Dairufa)
La Pucelle: Tactics (xxxx) (Elmesu)
Donkey Kong: Jungle Beat (xxxx) (Karate Kong)
The Legend of Zelda: The Wind Waker (xxxx) (Tingle)
The Legend of Zelda: Twilight Princess (xxxx) (Ganondorf)
Phantom Brave (xxxx) (Cauldron)
Super Smash Bros. Brawl (xxxx) (Ganondorf, Tingle)
Super Smash Bros. for Nintendo 3DS and Wii U (xxxx) (Ganondorf, Tingle)

Dubbing
Anthropoid (Uncle Hajský (Toby Jones))
The Mule (DEA Regional Manager (Pete Burris))
Vigil (Colin Robertson (Gary Lewis))

References

External links
 

1960 births
Japanese male voice actors
Living people
Male voice actors from Kōchi Prefecture
20th-century Japanese male actors
21st-century Japanese male actors
Arts Vision voice actors